The 2003–04 Croatian First Football League (officially known as the Prva HNL Ožujsko for sponsorship reasons) was the thirteenth season of the Croatian First Football League, the national championship for men's association football teams in Croatia, since its establishment in 1992. The season started on 24 July 2003 and ended on 15 May 2004. Dinamo Zagreb were the defending champions, having won their tenth championship title the previous season. Hajduk Split won the title, after a win against Varteks on 15 May 2004.

Teams

Stadia and personnel

 1 On final match day of the season, played on 15 May 2004.

First stage

Rounds 1–22 results

Championship group

Rounds 23–32 results

Relegation group

Rounds 23–32 results

Relegation play-off

First leg

Second leg

Međimurje win 4–2 on aggregate and are promoted to 2004–05 Prva HNL.

Top goalscorers

Source: 1.hnl.net

See also
2003–04 Croatian Second Football League
2003–04 Croatian Football Cup

External links
Season statistics at HRNogomet
2003–04 in Croatian Football at Rec.Sport.Soccer Statistics Foundation

Croatian Football League seasons
Cro
Prva Hnl, 2003-04